Qatar Aghaj (also Romanized as Qaţār Āghāj; also known as Ghatar Aghaj, Qaţār Āqāj, and Qatrākhāj) is a village in Shirin Su Rural District, Shirin Su District, Kabudarahang County, Hamadan Province, Iran. At the 2006 census, its population was 223, in 48 families.

References 

Populated places in Kabudarahang County